This is an incomplete list of lost television broadcasts that are lost to broadcasters in the United Kingdom.

ATV (ITV)

Call Oxbridge 2000
22 episodes are missing out of the total of 23 episodes. The surviving episode is Episode 1 of the first series, which was released as part of Soap Box: Volume 1 DVD.

The Cliff Richard Show

Crossroads
Out of 4,522 episodes, 2,854 episodes are missing and 2 other episodes exist on formats of lower quality than the original. A full list can be seen here

Emergency – Ward 10
Out of 1,139 episodes, 912 episodes are missing.  A full list can be seen here

General Hospital
Out of 340 episodes, 254 episodes are missing.  A full list can be seen here

The Golden Shot
Out of 366 episodes, 337  episodes are missing, 4 episodes are incomplete and 18 other episodes exist on formats of lower quality than the original.  A full list can be seen here

Little Big Time 
Out of the 52 episodes, only one episode is believed to exist from this 1968 children series, although the surviving episode isn’t fully available to the public, with only around 7-8 minutes of the episode being available to watch. A full list can be seen here

Lunch Box
Out of 1,334 episodes, none exist as originally broadcast. Being a live magazine show the majority would not have been recorded in the first place.  A collection of telerecorded sequences from the programme were retained. A full list can be seen here

Market in Honey Lane

Meet Peters and Lee

New Faces
Out of 166 episodes, 131 episodes are missing.  A full list can be seen here

Pipkins
Out of 333 episodes, 197 episodes are missing, 2 episodes are incomplete, and 56 episodes exist on formats of lower quality tapes than the original ones.  A full list can be seen here

Sara and Hoppity
Out of 52 episodes produced for the 1962-1963 series, 1 official episode exists in its entirety, as does the unaired pilot.

Saturday Variety
Although there are no episodes missing, one episode is only available on 16mm black-and-white film, having been recorded on 2" colour videotape.

Stryker of the Yard

Sunday Night at the London Palladium
Out of 389 episodes, 378 episodes are missing, and a further episode is incomplete.  A full list can be seen here

Thingumybob
7 out of the 8 episodes of this 1968 series are lost.

Timeslip
Although none of the 26 episodes are missing or incomplete, 19 episodes exist only on 16mm black-and-white film and it was originally recorded on 2" colour videotape.

Tiswas
Out of 302 episodes, the exact number of episodes are missing is unclear.  A list can be seen here

Two of a Kind
Out of 68 episodes, 18 episodes are missing.

BBC

199 Park Lane
Out of 18 episodes, all episodes are missing.

A for Andromeda
Out of 7 episodes, 4 episodes are missing and 2 episodes are incomplete.

Abigail and Roger
Out of 8 or 9 episodes, all episodes are missing.

Adam Adamant Lives!
Out of 29 episodes, 12 episodes are missing and 1 episode only exists in 16mm black-and-white film and it was originally telerecorded on 35mm black-and-white film.

Bachelor Father
Out of 22 episodes, 10 episodes are missing and 11 episode exist only on 16mm black-and-white film and it was originally recorded on 2" colour videotape.

Christmas Night with the Stars
Out of 105 mini episodes, 71 mini episodes are missing and further episode is incomplete. It is important to note that Christmas Night with the Stars showed short seasonal editions of popular shows.

Dad's Army

Two of the four Christmas sketches of Dad's Army (broadcast as part of Christmas Night with the Stars between 1968 and 1972) survive only as off-air soundtrack recordings:
 "Present Arms" (1968) - soundtrack found in 2008, picture still missing.
 "The Cornish Floral Dance" - soundtrack found (can be heard on the DVD boxset), picture still missing.

Dixon of Dock Green
Out of 436 episodes, 385 episodes are missing and 18 episodes are incomplete.
A full list can be seen here

Doctor Who

Audio versions survive.

Unaired lost episodes
In addition to the official list of missing episodes, also missing is the original Episode 1 of The Daleks. At some point after the recording, it was discovered that a technical problem had caused backstage voices to be heard on the resulting videotape; in early December 1963, the episode was remounted with a different costume for Susan. The only surviving portion is the reprise at the beginning of Episode 2.

Planet of Giants is another odd example, having originally recorded four episodes. Directed by Douglas Camfield and entitled "The Urge to Live", Episode 4 was spliced together with the original Episode 3 ("Crisis") to create a faster-paced climax with only Camfield being credited on the resulting episode. This decision, made by then-Head of Drama Sydney Newman, resulted in a gap at the end of the second production block (and the creation of Mission to the Unknown); the unused portions of Episodes 3 and 4 are believed to have been destroyed.

The Gnomes of Dulwich
Out of 6 episodes, all 6 episodes are missing.

The Goodies
Out of 76 episodes, 1 episode is missing, 2 episodes exist on black & white film.

Hancock's Half Hour
Out of 57 episodes, 26 episodes are missing.

The Likely Lads

Out of 20 episodes, 10 episodes are missing.

Marriage Lines
Out of 44 episodes + 2 shorts episodes, the exact number of episodes missing is unclear, as the BBC and Kaleidoscope both have different lists.  Both lists can be seen by clicking on BBC and Kaleidoscope

Marty
Out of 12 episodes, 4 episodes are missing (note sometimes series 2 is called "It's Marty")

The Morecambe & Wise Show

Out of 71 episodes, 5 episodes are missing, 1 is still being restored and 1 episode is incomplete. Off-air soundtracks survive.

Not in Front of the Children
Out of 38 episodes, 30 episodes are missing, 6 black and white episodes exist, 1 colour episode exists and 1 episode originally recorded on 2" colour videotape only exists as a 16mm b&w telerecording.

Pride and Prejudice
All 6 episodes are missing.

Top of the Pops
Out of 2,255 episodes, 514 episodes are missing, 97 episodes are incomplete and 13 other episodes exist on formats of lower quality than the original.
A full list can be seen here

References 

British television-related lists